The Selvåg mine is a titanium mine in Norway. The mine is located in Kobbvågfjellet, Langøya, Nordland and has reserves amounting to 44 million tonnes of ore grading 2.5% titanium.

References 

Titanium mines in Norway